Fengtun railway station is a railway station located in Hata Township, Fuyu County, Harbin, Heilongjiang on the Qiqihar–Bei'an railway. The station was put into operation in January 1931.

References

Railway stations in Heilongjiang
Stations on the Qiqihar–Bei'an railway
Railway stations in China opened in 1931